The Dacin Tigers was a semi-professional basketball club based in Taipei, Taiwan that plays in the Super Basketball League (SBL). They won SBL championships in 2009 and 2017.

On May 17, 2019, Dacin Engineering issued a statement that it will no longer participate in the Super Basketball League (SBL), nor will it invest in the professionalization of Taiwanese basketball, return to the social first-class basketball league, and withdraw again in 2021.

Notable players
- Set a club record or won an individual award as a professional player.
- Played at least one official international match for his senior national team at any time.

 Noel Felix
 Sim Bhullar
 Norvel Pelle
 Cheng Chih-lung
 Tien Lei
 O. J. Mayo

Notable coach

SBL regular season records
2003–04 season: 3rd place
2004–05 season: 3rd place
2005–06 season: 3rd place
2006–07 season: 4th place
2007–08 season: 5th place
2008–09 season: 1st place
2009–10 season: 1st place
2010–11 season: 3rd place
2011–12 season: 3rd place
2012–13 season: 3rd place
2013–14 season: 4th place
2014–15 season: 7th place
2015–16 season: 3rd place
2016–17 season: 1st place
2017–18 season: 4th place
2018–19 season: 6th place

Championships
2008–09
Champions: Dacin Tigers
Runners-up: Taiwan Beer
2016–17
Champions: Dacin Tigers
Runners-up: Yulon Luxgen Dinos

References

External links
 Club official website

Basketball teams established in 1995
Basketball teams disestablished in 2021
1995 establishments in Taiwan
2021 disestablishments in Taiwan
Sport in Taipei
 
Defunct basketball teams in Taiwan